Nyctimenius chiangi is a species of beetle in the family Cerambycidae. It was described by Huang, Liu and Chen in 2014. It is known from China.

References

Lamiinae
Beetles described in 2014